Diallus papuanus is a species of beetle in the family Cerambycidae. It was described by Stephan von Breuning in 1947. It is known from Papua New Guinea.

References

Lamiini
Beetles described in 1947
Taxa named by Stephan von Breuning (entomologist)